This is a list of supermarket chains in Canada. For supermarkets operating in other countries, see List of supermarket chains.

Major chains

Georgia Main Food Group operates:
Fresh St. Market
IGA / MarketPlace IGA in British Columbia only
London Drugs
Jim Pattison Group operates
Buy-Low Foods
Budget Foods
Buy-Low Foods
Nesters Market
Meinhardt Fine Foods 
Quality Foods
Shop n' Save
AG Foods
Choices Markets
Nature’s Fare Markets
Overwaitea Food Group
Bulkley Valley Wholesale
PriceSmart Foods
Save-On-Foods 
Urban Fare
Loblaw Companies operates:
Atlantic Cash & Carry
Atlantic Superstore
Axep
Bloor Street Market
Dominion
Les Entrepôts Presto
Extra Foods
Fortinos
Freshmart
L'Intermarché
Loblaws / Loblaw GreatFood / Loblaws CityMarket
Lucky Dollar Foods
Maxi / Maxi & Cie
NG Cash & Carry
No Frills
Provigo
Real Canadian Superstore
Shop Easy Foods
Shoppers Drug Mart / Pharmaprix
SuperValu
T & T Supermarket
Valu-mart
Wholesale Club / Club Entrepôt
Your Independent Grocer / Independent CityMarket
Zehrs Markets
Metro Inc. operates
Les 5 Saisons
Food Basics
Marché Adonis
Marché AMI
Marché Extra
Marché Richelieu
Metro / Metro Plus
Super C
Empire operates
Lawtons
Needs Convenience
Foodland some CO-OP stores in Atlantic Canada
FreshCo
IGA / IGA Extra in Alberta, Manitoba, Quebec, some parts of Atlantic Canada formerly CO-OP Atlantic and Saskatchewan only
Marché Bonichoix
Marché Tradition
Rachelle-Béry
Safeway
Sobeys
Thrifty Foods
Pete's Frootique
Farm Boy
Longo's (Sobeys has purchased 51% of Longo's, with an option to buy the remaining shares within the next 10 years)

Regional chains
 49th Parallel Grocery
 Ambrosia Natural Foods
Asian Food Centre
 Askew's Foods
 Avril (Health Supermarket)
Bruno’s Fine Foods
Centra Food Market
Coleman's
Co-op Atlantic:
Co-op Atlantic
Valu Foods
Village Food Stores
Coppa's Fresh Market
Country Grocer
Fairway Markets
Family Foods
Federated Co-operatives:
Calgary Co-op
Heritage Co-op (Western Manitoba)
North Central Co-op
Red River Co-op
Saskatoon Co-op
Foodex
FoodFare
Fresh City Market
Freson Bros.
Galleria Supermarkets
Goodness Me!
Grande Cheese
H Mart
Highland Farms
Italian Centre Shop
Kim Phat
Le Jardin Mobile
L&M Markets (Hometown Grocers Co-op)
Lalumière Bonanza
Le Marché Esposito
Le Marché Végétarien/Les Arpents Verts
Lococo's
Lucky Supermarket
Marche Adonis 
Mike Dean Local Grocer
Nations Fresh Food
Nature's Emporium
The North West Company
Northern
NorthMart
Organic Garage
Panchvati Supermarket
P.A.T. Mart
Planet Organic
Pomme Natural Market
Rabba Fine Foods
Quality Foods
Starsky Fine Foods
Sungiven Foods
Sunterra Market
Supermarché PA (5 stores)
SuperValu
TaiKo Supermarket
Vince's Market
Vincenzo's
Yummy Market

Non-conventional banners with in-store grocery markets
Costco
Dollarama
IKEA
Jean Coutu Group
London Drugs
Walmart Canada
Whole Foods Market
Pusateri's
Giant Tiger
M&M Food Market

Defunct chains
A&P
Best for Less
The Barn Fruit Markets
Canadian Tire (short-lived rollout)
Commisso's Food Markets
Cooper's Foods
Darrigo's
DiPietro's
Dominion Stores
Dutch Boy
Eatons Supermarket (Winnipeg)
Econo-Mart
Food Barn (Manitoba)
Food City
Food for Less (Calgary)
Galati Brothers
Garden Market IGA
Gordons
 Hudson's Bay Company Grocery (Winnipeg)
Kauffmans (Winnipeg)
Kmart Canada''
Knechtel Foods
Knob Hill Farms
Lady York
Loeb
Lofood
Marché Frais
Miracle Food Mart
Montemurro (North-Western Quebec and North-Eastern Ontario)
Mr. Grocer
N&D SuperMarkets (Windsor, had S&H Green Stamps)
OK Economy
Overwaitea Foods
Penner Foods (Manitoba)
Piggly Wiggly
Price Chopper
Red & White
Red Rooster
Sav-A-Centre 
SaveEasy
Starsky Foods
Steinberg's Supermarkets
Super Centre
Target Canada 
TomBoy (Manitoba, Sask. and Alberta)
Ultra Food & Drug
 Valdi
White's Supermarkets (Winnipeg)
Woodward's Food Floors

See also

List of Canadian stores
List of supermarket chains in North America
List of supermarket chains in South America

References 

Canada
Supermarkets of Canada
Supermarkets